The Dutch Eerste Divisie in the 1959–60 season was contested by 33 teams, divided in one group of sixteen and one group of seventeen teams. GVAV and Alkmaar '54 won the championship.

New entrants and group changes

Eerste Divisie A
Promoted from the 1958–59 Tweede Divisie:
 't Gooi
 Veendam
Relegated from the 1958–59 Eredivisie:
 TSV NOAD
Entered from the B-group:
 SBV Excelsior
 GVAV
 HVC
 KFC
 Rigtersbleek
 Stormvogels
 Vitesse Arnhem
 De Volewijckers

Eerste Divisie B
Promoted from the 1958–59 Tweede Divisie:
 DHC
 Go Ahead
Relegated from the 1958–59 Eredivisie:
 SHS (relegated as Holland Sport)
Entered from the A-group:
 AGOVV Apeldoorn
 Alkmaar '54
 DFC
 FC Eindhoven
 De Graafschap
 Leeuwarden
 Limburgia
 VSV
 ZFC

Final tables

Eerste Divisie A

Eerste Divisie B

Promotion play-offs

Relegation play-offs

See also
 1959–60 Eredivisie
 1959–60 Tweede Divisie

References
Netherlands - List of final tables (RSSSF)

Eerste Divisie seasons
2
Neth